The FPS Employment, Labour and Social Dialogue, more commonly referred to as the FPS Employment or the FPS Labour, is a Federal Public Service of Belgium. It was created by Royal Order on 3 February 2002, as part of the plans of the Verhofstadt I Government to modernise the federal administration. It is responsible for managing labour relations, ensuring the protection and promotion of occupational well-being, and participating in the development of social legislation.

The FPS Employment, Labour and Social Dialogue is responsible to the Federal Minister of Employment.

Organisation
The FPS Employment, Labour and Social Dialogue is organised into six Directorates-General:
 The Directorate General for Collective Labour Relations
 The Directorate General for Individual Labour Relations
 The Directorate General for Supervision of Social Legislation
 The Directorate General for Humanisation of Labour
 The Directorate General for Supervision of Occupational Well-being
 The Directorate General for Employment and Labour Market

External links
 Website of the FPS Employment Belgium

Employment
Belgium
Belgium, Employment
2002 establishments in Belgium
Labour in Belgium